State Route 79 (SR 79) is a  state highway that extends northeastward from Birmingham to the Tennessee state line. Prior to the completion of Interstate 65 (I-65), SR 79 was the southern part of the route that connected Birmingham and Huntsville.

The southern terminus of SR 79 is at an interchange of Tallapoosa Street with I-20/I-59 (exit 128) near Birmingham–Shuttlesworth International Airport. Prior to the completion of I-20/I-59, the terminus of SR 79 was at an intersection with US 31, US 78, and US 280 at the intersection of 8th Avenue North and 24th Street in downtown Birmingham.

Route description
SR 79 begins at a modified-diamond-interchange with I-20/59 in east Birmingham, near Birmingham Int'l Airport. The route turns northeast on a four-lane divided highway and continues in this direction until it reaches Pinson. It junctions with SR 151, which leads to SR 75. The route loses its four-lane divided highway status and becomes a two-lane road, crossing into Blount County.

In southern Blount County, there are no major junctions until it reaches Cleveland. It junctions with SR 160 and continues north for just about a mile, reaching US 231. It continues on its right-of-way until it crosses the Locust Fork and leaves US 231 in Blountsville. It junctions with US 278 a few miles later. It eventually enters Marshall County.

It eventually reaches Guntersville. It junctions with US 431. It maintains a concurrency with it, junctioning with SR 69 and SR 227 before splitting off from US 431 and heading north to the Jackson County line.

In Jackson County, there are no major junctions until it turns off of its right-of-way, with its right-of-way becoming SR 279, in Scottsboro. It junctions with US 72 and SR 35 before leaving the city. In Skyline, the route junctions with SR 146. It continues north until it crosses the Tennessee state line, where it continues as Tennessee State Route 16 (SR 16) towards Winchester, TN.

Future

Due to population growth in the area, there are long range plans to widen SR 79 to four lanes into southwestern Blount County.

Major intersections

See also

References

079
Transportation in Jefferson County, Alabama
Transportation in Blount County, Alabama
Transportation in Marshall County, Alabama
Transportation in Jackson County, Alabama
Transportation in Birmingham, Alabama